The Convento de San Antonio de Padua is a Franciscan convent located in Toledo, Castile-La Mancha, Spain. Dedicated to St Anthony of Padua, the institution was created in 1525 in the former palace of the advisor comunero Don Fernando de Ávalos, confiscated by order of Charles V, Holy Roman Emperor because its owner was a comunero. The entrance is Gothic-Mudéjar of the 15th Century.

The church was designed by Juan Bautista Monegro.
The chapter house and the choir, of the same period, conserves a floor of azulejos. Its main altar has an 18th-Century Baroque altarpiece. In the side chapels are located the sepulchers of its founders, the De la Fuente family.

References

External links

Convents in Spain
Order of Friars Minor
Roman Catholic churches in Toledo, Spain
Roman Catholic churches completed in 1525
Azulejos in Castilla–La Mancha
16th-century Roman Catholic church buildings in Spain